The Queen's Baton Relay for the 2022 Commonwealth Games covered 90,000 miles and visited 72 Commonwealth nations and territories from Birmingham Airport. The journey began at Buckingham Palace on 7 October 2021 and ended in Birmingham during the opening ceremony on 28 July 2022.

This relay marked the last time under Queen Elizabeth II prior to her death on 8 September 2022.

Organisation 
The Relay was organised by the Birmingham Organising Committee for the 2022 Commonwealth Games, a private company based at One Brindleyplace. The 14-strong board of directors includes Dame Louise Martin, Ellie Simmonds, OBE, Nick Timothy and Ama Agbeze, MBE.

The Queen's baton 

Designed and manufactured in the West Midlands by a collaborative team including Technologist Karen Newman of Birmingham Open Media (BOM), Designers and Engineers Kelly Raymont-Osman and Tom Osman of Raymont-Osman Product Design, artist Laura Nyahuye of Maokwo, and Engineer and Modelmaker Karl Hamlin of Kajul Ltd, the baton features a platinum strand along its length to commemorate the Platinum Jubilee of Elizabeth II in 2022. Made using the traditional method of lost-wax casting, apart from the platinum the baton has purposely been made from non-precious metals and alloys: copper, aluminium and brass to represent the gold, silver and bronze medals awarded at the games. It includes a camera, a heart-rate monitor, an atmospheric sensor and lights that change each time the baton is passed from person to person.

International route 
The route of the Queen's baton relay took in all Commonwealth countries and territories during a 294-day schedule.

Africa

The Americas

Asia

Oceania

Europe

England National route 

The baton is due to travel around London from 2-6 June 2022 and the rest of England during July.

See also
Queen's Baton Relay
2018 Commonwealth Games Queen's Baton Relay
Official website

References

Platinum Jubilee of Elizabeth II
2022 Commonwealth Games
Queen's baton relays